Madam Chairman is a Philippine television comedy drama broadcast by TV5 starring Sharon Cuneta, Jay Manalo and Byron Ortile. It aired on October 14, 2013 to February 28, 2014 on the network's primetime block. It is credited as Cuneta's first ever teleserye. It revolves around a barangay chairwoman and her struggles in dividing her role as a mother and as a public official.

Cast and characters
Main cast
 Sharon Cuneta as Elizabeth "Bebeth" de Guzman
 Jay Manalo as Armando "Dodong" de Guzman
 Akihiro Blanco as Antonello "Bubuy" de Guzman
 Shaira Diaz as Katherine "Kakay" de Guzman
 Byron Ortile as Armando "Junjun" de Guzman Jr. 
 Regine Angeles as Beverly Pagaspas
 Bayani Agbayani as Jojo Camponanes

Supporting cast
 Glenda Kennedy as Mercy
 Nanette Inventor as Salud
 Tony Mabesa as Father Andy 
 Jim Pebangco as Mayor Sid Magbutay
 Lou Veloso as Vice Mayor Fortunato Gigil
 Lovely Abella as Mayor Sid's Secretary
 Bearwin Meily as Ben Boljak 
 Manny Castañeda as Hermes
 Fanny Serrano as Moises 
 Malou de Guzman as Cita
 Gilleth Sandico
 Toby Alejar
 Patani
 Malak So Shdifat
 Claire Ruiz
 Adrian Sebastian
 Chris Cuneta
 Mavi Lozano
 Clint Gabo

Special guest
Richard Gomez
Bing Loyzaga
Epi Quizon
Giselle Sanchez
Ara Mina
Joseph Bitangcol
IC Mendoza
April Gustilo
Chanel Morales
Paolo Paraiso
Caloy Alde
Cita Astals
Ana Feleo
Prince Estefan
Nicole Estrada
RS Francisco
Kevin Balot
Divine Lee
Mae Paner (A.K.A. Juana Change)
G Toengi

See also
List of programs broadcast by TV5 (Philippines)
List of programs aired by TV5 (Philippines)

References

External links
TV5 Philippines Official website

Philippine drama television series
2013 Philippine television series debuts
2014 Philippine television series endings
TV5 (Philippine TV network) drama series
Filipino-language television shows